Lestes tridens is a species of damselfly in the family Lestidae, the spreadwings. It is known commonly as the spotted spreadwing. It is native to much of the southern half of Africa, where it is widespread. It lives along the edges of lakes and swamps. It is not considered to be threatened.

References

External links
 
 Lestes tridens on African Dragonflies and Damselflies Online

T
Odonata of Africa
Arthropods of Southern Africa
Insects of South Africa
Insects described in 1895
Taxonomy articles created by Polbot